Hazen Airport may refer to:

 Hazen Municipal Airport in Hazen, Arkansas, United States (FAA: 6M0)
 Mercer County Regional Airport (formerly Hazen Municipal Airport) in Hazen, North Dakota, United States (FAA/IATA: HZE)